Two Royal Navy vessels have been named HMS Badminton, after Badminton, Gloucestershire:

 , a  minesweeper launched May 1918; sold 1928
 , a  launched 1954; broken up in 1970

Royal Navy ship names